Cagnicourt is a commune in the Pas-de-Calais département in the Hauts-de-France region of France.

Geography
A farming village located 11 miles (18 km) southeast of Arras at the junction of the D13 with the D14E.

Population

Places of interest
 The church of St.Martin, rebuilt in the 20th century, as was much of the village, after the ravages of World War I.
 The Commonwealth War Graves Commission cemetery.

See also
Communes of the Pas-de-Calais department

Notes

External links

 The CWGC cemetery
 Cagnicourt on the Quid website 

Communes of Pas-de-Calais